Royle's pika (Ochotona roylei), also called the Himalayan mouse hare or hui shutu, is a species of pika. It is found in Bhutan, China, India, Nepal, and Pakistan.

Description
The most common pika species in the Himalayas, it has a length of 17-22 centimeters. Royle's pika has a slightly arched head, with a rufous-grey body and chestnut-colored head, as well as sparse hair in front of its ears.

Distribution and habitat
This is the most common pika species in the Himalayas, and can be confused with the sympatric large-eared pika. These species are mostly seen in the open rocky mountain edges or slopes, or on ground covered with conifer trees, such as pine, deodar and rhododendron forests. Royle's pika are a crepuscular foraging species, as they tend to be inactive during midday hours. Reduction of activity during the midday is also contributed to increasing temperatures, which causes heat stress on the species. During monsoon season, foraging is encouraged due to greater food availability. The species has also been found near human habitation. It does not make its own nest; rather, it takes narrow creeks and existing burrow systems as its nest, filling it with hay piles and pine leaves. It also uses the rocky areas on the mountains to take refuge and escape from predators.

Conservation status
Though their conservation status according to IUCN Red List is "Least Concern", habitat loss and human habitation in hilly areas are the indirect cause of conservation threats towards them.

References

Bhattacharyya, Sabuji (December 12, 2018). "Noninvasive sampling reveals population genetic structure in the Royle's pika,Ochotona roylei, in the western Himalaya". Ecology and Evolution. 9 (1). Retrieved October 15, 2020.
Smith, A.T.; Boyer, A.F. (2008). "Ochotona roylei". IUCN Red List of Threatened Species. 2008. Retrieved 10 April 2009. Database entry includes a brief justification of why this species is of least concern.
Lissovsky, A.A. 2014. Taxonomic revision of pikas Ochotona (Lagomorpha, Mammalia) at the species level. Mammalia 78(2): 199–216.

Pikas
Mammals of Asia
Mammals of Nepal
Mammals of Pakistan
Mammals described in 1839
Taxonomy articles created by Polbot